Sud Cinti (also Sur Cinti) is a province in the Bolivian department of Chuquisaca.

Subdivision 
The province is divided into three municipalities which are further subdivided into cantons. The municipalities with their seats are:

See also 
 Puka Pampa River

Provinces of Chuquisaca Department